This is list of members of the Argentine Chamber of Deputies from 10 December 2015 to 9 December 2017.

Composition

By province

By political groups 

As of 9 December 2017

Election cycles

List of Deputies 

The table is sorted by provinces in alphabetical order, and then with their deputies in alphabetical order by their surnames. All deputies start their term on December 10, and end it on December 9 of the corresponding years, except when noted.

See also
 List of current Argentine senators

Notes

External links
Official site 

2015